The Russian Orthodox Church in the USA is the name of the group of parishes of the Russian Orthodox Church in America that are under the canonical authority of the Patriarch of Moscow. They were previously known as the Russian Exarchate of North America before autocephaly was granted to the Orthodox Church in America (OCA) in 1970. 

All of the parishes of the exarchate were given a choice to join the OCA at that time. The parishes that remained were the following: 
St. Nicholas Church, Brookside, Alabama
St. Demetrius Monastery, Bellflower, California
 Christ the Savior Church, San Francisco, California
 St. Nicholas Cathedral, San Francisco, California
 Church of All Saints Glorified in the Russian Land, San Francisco, California
 Our Lady of Kazan Church, San Diego, California
 Resurrection Church, Chicago, Illinois
 Dormition Church, Benld, Illinois
 Holy Trinity Church, Baltimore, Maryland
 St. Elias Church, Battle Creek, Michigan
 St. Innocent Church, Detroit, Michigan
 St. Michael the Archangel Church, Detroit, Michigan
 Church of St. Andrew the First-Called Apostle, East Lansing, Michigan
 Holy Trinity Church, Saginaw, Michigan
 St. John Chrysostom Church, Grand Rapids, Michigan
 House Chapel of St. Seraphim of Sarov, Westtown, New York
 St. Demetrius Church, Jackson, Michigan
 St. Nicholas Church, Bayonne, New Jersey
 Sts. Peter and Paul Church, Elizabeth, New Jersey
 Three Hierarchs Church, Garfield, New Jersey
 Holy Cross Church, Hackettstown, New Jersey
 Sts. Peter and Paul Church; Passaic, New Jersey
 St. John the Baptist Church, Singac, New Jersey
 St. Olga Church, Somerset, New Jersey
 St. Mark Chapel, New York
 Church of St. George the Great Martyr, New York
 Church of All Saints Glorified in the Russian Land, on the estate of Pine Bush, New York
 St. John the Baptist Chapel, Bronx, New York
 Church of All Saints Glotified in the Russian Land, Amsterdam (Wolf Run), Ohio
 St. Stephen Church, Lorain, Ohio
 Nativity of Christ Church, Youngstown, Ohio
 St. Nicholas Church, Chester, Pennsylvania
 St. Nicholas Church, Pageville, Edinboro, Pennsylvania
 St. Nicholas Church, Reading, Pennsylvania
 Sts. Peter and Paul Church, Mount Union, Pennsylvania
 St. Nicholas Church, Wilkes-Barre, Pennsylvania
 St. Andrew the Apostle Church, Philadelphia, Pennsylvania
 St. Michael the Archangel Church, Philadelphia, Pennsylvania
 Sts. Peter and Paul Church, Scranton, Pennsylvania
 Sts. Peter and Paul Church, Burgaw, North Carolina
 St. Gregory the Theologian Church, Tampa, Florida
 Sts. Peter and Paul Church, Manchester, New Hampshire
 Church of St. George the Great Martyr, Buffalo, New York
 All Exarchate parishes and clergy in Canada
 St. Nicholas Cathedral, New York

Bishops
Vicar of His Holiness Patriarch of Moscow and All Russia, Administrator of the Patriarchal parishes in the USA:

 Macarius (Svistun), Bishop of Uman (1970—1974)
 Job (Tyvoniuk), Bishop of Zaraisk (1975—1976)
 Irenaeus (Seredny), Bishop of Serpukhov (1976—1982)
 Clement (Kapalin), Bishop of Serpukhov (1982—1990)
 Macarius (Svistun), Bishop of Klin (1990—1992)
 Paul (Ponomaryov), Bishop of Zaraisk (1992—1999)
 Mercurius (Ivanov), Bishop of Zaraisk (2000–2009)
 Job (Smakouz), Bishop of Kashira (2009-2010)
 Justinian (Ovchinnikov), Archbishop of Naro-Fominsk (2010–2014)
 John (Roshchin) (2014-2018)
 (temporary administrator since 14 October 2018)

References

External links
SS. Peter & Paul’s R.O. Cathedral, Passaic, New Jersey - The Carpathian Connection.
The Patriarchal Parishes in the USA, Moscow Patriarchate.

Russian Orthodoxy in the United States
Eastern Orthodoxy-related lists
Eastern Orthodox dioceses in the United States
Patriarchal Parishes in the USA